Samraong Commune is a khum (commune) in Samraŏng District, Takéo Province, Cambodia.

Administration 
As of 2019, Samraong Commune has 9 phums (villages) as follows.

References 

Communes of Takéo province
Samraong District